Joel B. Green (born May 7, 1956) is an American  New Testament scholar, theologian, author, Associate Dean of the Center for Advanced Theological Study, and Professor of New Testament Interpretation at Fuller Theological Seminary in Pasadena, California. Green is a prolific author who has written on a diverse range of topics related to both New Testament scholarship and theology. He is an ordained elder of the United Methodist Church.

Education
Green holds the academic degrees of Bachelor of Science, conferred by Texas Tech University in 1978, Master of Theology, received in 1982 from the Perkins School of Theology at Southern Methodist University; and Doctor of Philosophy from the University of Aberdeen, Scotland, obtained in 1985.

Career
From 1992 to 1997 Green was Associate Professor of New Testament Interpretation at the American Baptist Seminary of the West and the Graduate Theological Union in Berkeley, California. From 1997 to 2007 he was a professor at Asbury Seminary in Wilmore, Kentucky, dean of the School of Theology, and provost, before taking up the post of Professor of New Testament Interpretation at Fuller Theological Seminary in Pasadena, California. In 2011, Green was named as the general editor of the New International Commentary on the New Testament (NICNT). He has served as chair of the Council of the Society of Biblical Literature and a member of the board of directors of the Institute for Biblical Research.

Theology
Green has a Wesleyan-Arminian approach of the Scripture.

Publications 
He has written and edited some fifty-five books. They include Dictionary of Jesus and the Gospels, Dictionary of Scripture and Ethics, and In Search of the Soul: Four Views of the Mind-Body Problem.

He has also written many articles and chapters, both for academic study and for general readership. He is the General Editor of the Wesley Study Bible. He is also the editor of the Journal of Theological Interpretation, and serves on the editorial board of such journals as Science and Theology and Science & Christian Belief. He is the New Testament editor for the Common English Bible.

Selected works

Books

Edited by

References

Citations

Sources

External links 
 
 Asbury Seminary: Joel Green
 Zondervan:Authors 
 Abingdon Press 
 List of thirty books by Joel B. Green
 NICNT

1956 births
Academic journal editors
Alumni of the University of Aberdeen
American biblical scholars
American Christian theologians
American United Methodist clergy
Arminian ministers
Arminian theologians
Fuller Theological Seminary faculty
Living people
New Testament scholars
Southern Methodist University alumni
Texas Tech University alumni